Iddris Sandu is an American entrepreneur, programmer, engineer, and digital architect. He is the CEO of Spatial Labs Inc., a hardware software infrastructure company.

Early life
Sandu was born in Accra, Ghana. Sandu grew up in Compton, California, before later moving to Harbor City, California. He moved to the United States with his family at the age of 3 and learned computer programming at the age of ten. At the age of 13, he was offered an internship at Google where he worked on Google+ and designs for other social connectivities. In high school, he created an app for his school that provided turn by turn navigation for students to navigate around the campus using augmented reality. Sandu also advocated for STEM in the high school curriculum.

Career
Sandu has worked as a technological design consultant and engineer with companies such as Boeing, Twitter, Lockheed Martin, Raytheon, Uber, Snapchat and Instagram. For Uber he created the software called Autonomous Collision Detection Interface, a software program that detects a driver's hand motion and position.

He has worked on digital content for Beyonce, Kanye West, Migos, Travis Scott, Rihanna, Jay Z, and Jaden Smith. In 2017, he partnered with Nipsey Hussle to open the Marathon clothing store in LA.  

In 2021, Sandu founded Spatial Labs, a hardware software infrastructure company based in Los Angeles. In October 2021, Marcy Venture Partnership (MVP) founded by Jay-Z invested in Spatial Labs. In 2022, Spatial Labs launched Gen One Hardwear, a collection of garments embedded with LNQ’s proprietary LNQ One Chip, and LNQ Marketplace, a retail platform to trade physical goods on the blockchain.

Awards
In 2022, Sandu was featured in the Ebony Power 100 list. In 2019, he won the Young African Committed to Excellence (YACE) Rising Star award and the Technology Award at the Culture Creators Innovators & Leaders Awards. He has also received a Certificate of Commendation from Barack Obama.

See also
Sandu interview

External links
Gen Z: Plan A | Iddris Sandu | TEDxCrenshaw 
Iddris Sandu | Raw & Uncut Part 1
Iddris Sandu Talks His Career and More | BHL's Next

References

Living people
Technicians
Software engineers
People from Los Angeles
People from Accra
Ghanaian businesspeople
1997 births
African-American engineers
21st-century African-American people